Headrick may refer to:

 Sherrill Headrick (1937–2008), American football player
 Headrick, Oklahoma, a town in Jackson County